Rocky Hollow is a British stop-motion animated children's television series co-produced by Bumper Films and Rockscene Ltd. The show was narrated by Peter Sallis, who later became the voice of Wallace in Wallace and Gromit. This was the first children's television show to be produced by Bumper Films for S4C. The firm later made Fireman Sam, Joshua Jones and Starhill Ponies for the BBC. These were in production with S4C, Mike Young Productions and Prism Art and Design Ltd.

Rocky Hollow first appeared as Deri Deg in Welsh on S4C in 1985, finished in 1986, and later in English throughout the United Kingdom on The Children's Channel during the same year and ITV in 1989 as part of It's Stardust! (a wrapper programme for children hosted by rock singer Alvin Stardust). The English version finished in 1986, same as the Welsh version. The Welsh version was frequently repeated until 1998.

It was also screened in Ireland first on RTÉ One in 1991 before the US animated series DuckTales and then on RTÉ2 in 1992 as part of The Saturday Club along with the British cult marionette series from the 1960s Thunderbirds and the Irish puppet series The Rimini Riddle and in New Zealand on TVNZ 1.

Most of the episodes were released on various VHS videos in the late 80s and early 90s, but the program has never been officially released on DVD.

Characters
 Mr Oak - The old man of Rocky Hollow that wears a yellow shirt and a big brown hat. He is very wise and helps to keep the other people of Rocky Hollow on track.
 Acorn - A young boy that wears a blue singlet and a baseball cap. The mischievous nephew of Mr Oak who loves skateboarding, ice cream, and playing tricks on other people.
 Sycamore - A tall skinny young man that wears white gym clothing and a long red scarf. He is good friends with Acorn and helps Mr Oak often on tasks. He is rather clumsy and trips over his own scarf but very friendly.
 Miss Myrtle - A lady with blonde hair that wears a purple dress. She loves to be well dressed at all times and likes to organize picnics.
 Conker - A man with red facial hair and a large red nose that wears overalls. He is the handy man of Rocky Hollow that fixes things like clocks, chairs and boxes.
 Rosie Woodpigeon - A female Pigeon that wears a post hat and yellow gumboots. She delivers letters all over Rocky Hollow and often stops by for tea. She also has a Welsh accent and calls everyone her "Lovlies".

Episodes

Volume 1 
 "The Picnic"
 "Keep Fit"
 "The Post Bag"
 "The Operation"
 "Spring Cleaning"
 "Ghosts"
 "Treasure"
 "The Birthday Party"

Volume 2 
 "Burglars"
 "The Vase"
 "Sorting Letters"
 "The Concert"
 "The Photograph"
 "Camping"
 "Playing Tricks"
 "The Kite"

Credits
 Story: Bill Clout, Nona Hooper
 Told by: Peter Sallis
 Music: Ian Frampton, Nigel Hess
 Sound: John Cross
 Editor: Richard Bradley
 Puppets: Ian Frampton
 Director: John Walker
 Made by Bumper Films Ltd for S4C–Channel 4 Wales
 Rocky Hollow ©Rockscene Ltd 1983
 ©S4C 1983
 ©S4C 1985

References

External links
 
 Rocky Hollow on Toonhound

1980s Welsh television series
1985 British television series debuts
1986 British television series endings
British children's animated television shows
S4C original programming
British stop-motion animated television series
1980s British animated television series
1980s British children's television series
Television series by Mattel Creations